Tim Hesse (born 7 March 1968) is a Ghanaian sprinter. He competed in the men's 400 metres at the 1992 Summer Olympics.

References

External links
 

1968 births
Living people
Athletes (track and field) at the 1992 Summer Olympics
Ghanaian male sprinters
Olympic athletes of Ghana
Place of birth missing (living people)
20th-century Ghanaian people